The Saint (film series) refers to eight B movies made by RKO Pictures between 1938 and 1941, based on some of the books in British author Leslie Charteris' long-running series about the  fictional character Simon Templar, better known as The Saint.

A few years after creating the character in 1928, Charteris was successful in getting RKO Radio Pictures interested in a film based on one of his books. The first, The Saint in New York, came in 1938 and was based on the 1935 novel of the same name. It starred Louis Hayward as Simon Templar and Jonathan Hale as Inspector Henry Farnack, the American counterpart to the British character, Chief inspector Claud Eustace Teal.

The film was a success and seven more films followed rapidly. They were sometimes based upon outlines by Charteris, while others were based loosely on his novels or novellas. George Sanders took over from Hayward as The Saint in the second film, and starred in a further four between 1939 and 1941, before being enticed by RKO to play the lead in their forthcoming series about The Falcon, which they made into a blatant copy of The Saint.

In 1941, Hugh Sinclair took over the role as Templar for two more films; The Saint's Vacation and The Saint Meets the Tiger. However, by the time shooting finished of The Saint Meets the Tiger in June 1941, a major dispute ensued between Charteris and RKO over the upcoming first film in The Falcon series, The Gay Falcon, which was due for release in October 1941. Charteris argued that it was a case of copyright infringement, as RKO's version of The Falcon was an obvious copy of his own character, and the fact that their film starred George Sanders, who personified The Saint after having played him in five of the seven films released up to that point, made this even more obvious.

The legal dispute forced RKO to put the film on hold. The conflict wasn't settled until 1943, with RKO selling the US distribution rights to Republic Pictures, while RKO's British arm handled the UK distribution as originally planned. The film was released in both countries in 1943.

 The Saint in New York (1938) – with Louis Hayward as The Saint
 The Saint Strikes Back (1939) – with George Sanders as The Saint
 The Saint in London (1939) – with George Sanders as The Saint
 The Saint's Double Trouble (1940) – with George Sanders as The Saint
 The Saint Takes Over (1940) – with George Sanders as The Saint
 The Saint in Palm Springs (1941) –with George Sanders as The Saint
 The Saint's Vacation (1941) – with Hugh Sinclair as The Saint
 The Saint Meets the Tiger (produced in 1941 but not released until 1943) – with Hugh Sinclair as The Saint

In the 1930s, RKO also purchased the rights to produce a film adaptation of Saint Overboard, but no such film was ever produced.

A ninth film, The Saint's Return (known as The Saint's Girl Friday in the US) from 1953, with Louis Hayward returning as The Saint, is sometimes regarded as part of the RKO series. However, it was produced by British Hammer Film Productions 12 years after the conflict between Charteris and RKO, based on a special agreement between Hammer Films and Leslie Charteris, which gave Charteris a percentage in the film. RKO acted only as the film's US distributor, six months after the UK release.

See also 
 The Saint (1997)

References 

Film series introduced in 1938
The Saint (Simon Templar)
American black-and-white films
American film series
RKO Pictures films